The Solomon Pond Mall is a two-level enclosed shopping mall located off Interstate 290, near its terminus at Interstate 495, in Marlborough, Massachusetts (with the northern part of the mall in Berlin). The mall features JCPenney and  Macy's (originally Filene's) as anchors with one vacant anchor last occupied by Sears.

History

The mall opened in 1996 and was one of many that opened along the Interstate 495 corridor from the mid-1980s to the mid-1990s. Initially the mall's location seemed remote as it was located far from other retail. However, the mall was able to strategically target both the affluent and booming western crescent of suburbs of Boston, while simultaneously serving as the largest mall for the Worcester area.

In comparison to other mid-range malls along the Interstate 495 corridor, the Solomon Pond Mall attempted to shoot for the upscale by courting some higher end tenants such as Victoria's Secret, Swarovski Crystal and several jeweler chains.

Some of the higher end tenants include Coach and Apple Store.

On February 15, 2021, it was announced that Sears would be closing as part of a plan to close 34 stores nationwide. The store closed on May 2, 2021.

As of 2021, the mall is currently managed by Pacific Retail Capital Partners. It was managed by Simon Property Group as recently as May 2021.

Gallery

References

External links
 

Buildings and structures in Middlesex County, Massachusetts
Shopping malls established in 1996
Shopping malls in Massachusetts
Tourist attractions in Middlesex County, Massachusetts